Dint may refer to:

 William Colbeck (gangster) (1890-1943), American gangster nicknamed "Dint"
 Dint Island, Antarctica